The .300 Sherwood, also known as the .300 Extra Long and the .300 Westley, is an obsolete centerfire rifle cartridge developed by Westley Richards.

Design

The cartridge was available in both solid lead and the then revolutionary LT-capped bullets were available.

History
The .300 Sherwood was introduced by Westley Richards in 1901 in response to W.W. Greener's .310 Cadet cartridge.  The cartridge was created by lengthening the much milder .300 Rook.

As expected, the first rifles chambered for it were made by Westley Richards both in a miniature Martini actioned single-shot rifle and the "Sherwood" target rifle, a modified takedown Martini actioned rifle with an easily removable barrel and a detachable lock mechanism held in place by a thumb screw.

Later other manufacturers produced rifles in the caliber including BSA, Vickers and Francotte, whilst high end double rifles were produced by Holland & Holland and Westley Richards. As recently as 2002, Westley Richards produced a double rifle in the .300 Sherwood.

The .300 Sherwood was a notably accurate target round, but arrived at the point when miniature rifle shooting was moving towards the .22 Long Rifle, shorter ranges and more indoor competition.

Use

Whilst a noted target round, the .300 Sherwood was also used for hunting, it was considered more suited for small deer than for small game.

Notes

See also
List of rifle cartridges
7 mm rifle cartridges

References

External links
 Ammo-One, "300 Sherwood", ammo-one.com, retrieved 19 April 2017.
 Cartridgecollector, "300 Sherwood", cartridgecollector.net, retrieved 19 April 2017.
 The Spanish Association of Cartridge Collectors, ".300 Westley", municion.org , retrieved 19 April 2017.

Pistol and rifle cartridges
British firearm cartridges
Rook rifle cartridges
Westley Richards cartridges